Seif el-Din el-Zoubi (1913 – 26 June 1986) was an Israeli-Arab politician.

Biography
El-Zoubi was born in 1913 in Nazareth, where he attended high school. During the British Mandate of Palestine, he was active in the Haganah, and later received the Fighter of the State Decoration. 

In 1949 he was elected to the Knesset as the leader of the Democratic List of Nazareth. He was re-elected in 1951 on the Democratic List for Israeli Arabs, and 1955, but resigned from the Knesset on 13 February 1956. In 1959, he became mayor of Nazareth, the city's first Muslim mayor in decades, and held the post until 1965, when he returned to the Knesset on the Progress and Development list, which briefly merged into Cooperation and Development before regaining its independence. He was re-elected in 1969, and was appointed Deputy Speaker of the Knesset. in 1971, el-Zoubi became mayor of Nazareth again, holding the post until 1974. 

el-Zoubi was re-elected in 1973. In 1974, Progress and Development merged into the Alignment, before leaving it and forming the United Arab List. He was re-elected for a final time on the United Arab List slate in 1977, before resigning his seat on 3 April 1979. He died in 1986.

Haneen Zoabi, who served as a Member of the Knesset for the Joint List, is a relative.

Controversy
According to Israeli historian Ori Stendel, el-Zoubi had used his ties with the Israeli establishment to compensate for the decline of his political power within the Zubia clan. Historian Hillel Cohen wrote that el-Zoubi was "upgraded" by Mapai in exchange for relinquishing national demands and legitimizing land confiscations. Yitzhak Laor described his conduct as tantamount to taking political bribery.

Publications
Autobiography: ”Eyewitness” (1987)

References

Notes

External links

1913 births
1986 deaths
Alignment (Israel) politicians
Arab members of the Knesset
Arab people in Mandatory Palestine
Cooperation and Development politicians
Democratic List for Israeli Arabs politicians
Democratic List of Nazareth politicians
Deputy Speakers of the Knesset
Haganah members
Leaders of political parties in Israel
Mayors of Nazareth
Members of the 1st Knesset (1949–1951)
Members of the 2nd Knesset (1951–1955)
Members of the 3rd Knesset (1955–1959)
Members of the 6th Knesset (1965–1969)
Members of the 7th Knesset (1969–1974)
Members of the 8th Knesset (1974–1977)
Members of the 9th Knesset (1977–1981)
Politicians from Nazareth
Progress and Development politicians
United Arab List (1977) politicians